Phallomedusa is a genus of small, air-breathing land snails with an operculum, a pulmonate gastropod mollusc.

Phallomedusa is the only genus in the family Phallomedusidae.

Species
Species in the genus Phallomedusa include:
 Phallomedusa solida (Martens, 1878)
 Phallomedusa austrina Golding, Ponder & Byrne, 2007

References

Phallomedusidae